In heraldry, murrey is a "stain", i. e. a non-standard tincture, that is a dark reddish purple colour. It is most proximate in appearance to the heraldic tincture of purpure, but is distinct therefrom.

Overview
According to dictionaries, "murrey" is the colour of mulberries, being somewhere between the heraldic tinctures of gules (red) and purpure (purple), and almost maroon; but examples registered in Canada and Scotland display it as a reddish brown.

The livery colours of the House of York in England in the fifteenth century were azure and murrey, as depicted on the shields of the Falcon of the Plantagenets and the White Lion of Mortimer, which are 2 of the Queen's Beasts.

See also
Mulberry (color)
Purple
Purpure
Sanguigne
Stain (heraldry)
Tenné
Tincture (heraldry)

References

External links

Stains
Shades of violet